The lip is a soft, protruding organ at the mouth of many animals, including humans.

Lip or lips may also refer to:

In arts and entertainment
 Lips (New Zealand band)
 Lips (video game), a karaoke game for the Xbox 360
 "Lips" (KAT-TUN song), a single by the Japanese band KAT-TUN
 Lip (album), a 2019 album by the Japanese band Sekai no Owari
 The Lips, a 2010 Argentine film
 "L.I.P. (Local Indigenous Personnel)", an episode of the television series M*A*S*H
 Lip Gallagher, a character on the television drama Shameless
 Lip, the main character of the Super Famicom video game Panel de Pon
 Lips, a muppet character from The Muppet Show, the trumpet player for Dr. Teeth and The Electric Mayhem
 Lips Manlis, a criminal in the Dick Tracy comic, portrayed in the film by Paul Sorvino
 Lip, a jazz term for glissando, a glide from one pitch to another in music
 Lip (magazine), an Australian interdisciplinary feminist art journal (1976–1984)

Nickname or stage name
 Leo Durocher (1905–1991), American Hall-of-Fame Major League Baseball player, manager and coach nicknamed "Leo the Lip"
 Steve "Lips" Kudlow, singer in Canadian rock band Anvil
 Lipman Lip Pike (1845–1893), one of the first professional baseball players and first Jewish one
 Tony Lip (1930–2013), American actor born Frank Anthony Vallelonga

Other uses
Lips (surname)
 Lip (gastropod)
 Lip, a colloquial term for dipping tobacco, or dip
 Lips, a minor Greek god and one of the Anemoi, representing the southwest wind
 The labia of the vulva, also called the outer and inner lips

LIP or LIPS

Organizations
 Laboratory of Instrumentation and Experimental Particles Physics, a Portuguese physics scientific research organization
 London Institute of 'Pataphysics
 Lok Insaaf Party, a political party in Punjab, India

In technology
 Language Interface Pack, a translated interface for Microsoft Windows or Microsoft Office products 
 Laser-induced breakdown spectroscopy

 Lithium-ion polymer battery, a rechargeable battery technology
 Linux Phone Standards Forum, dedicated to the creation of standards aimed at fostering the use of Linux on mobile devices
 Loop Initialization Primitive, a Fibre Channel protocol element
 CaPSL, a printer command language/page description language, also called LIPS or LIPS4

Other uses
 LIP (company), a troubled French manufacturer of watches and clocks
 Large igneous province, a massive volcanic formation resulting from flood basalt eruptions
 Lateral intraparietal cortex, a region in the parietal lobe of the brain of primates
 Late-inning pressure situation, a baseball statistic
 Life In Pictures, a defunct band from Arizona
 Litigant in person, someone who is engaged in litigation without legal representation
 Lymphocytic interstitial pneumonia, a clinical stage 3 HIV infection

See also
 Flange
 Embouchure or lipping, the use of the lips, facial muscles, tongue, and teeth in playing a wind musical instrument
 Rim